were medieval territory stewards in Japan, especially in the Kamakura and Muromachi shogunates. Appointed by the shōgun, jitō managed manors, including national holdings governed by the kokushi or provincial governor. There were also deputy jitōs called jitōdai.

History 
The term jitō (literally meaning "land head") began to be used in the late Heian period as an adjectival word like "local". For example, a jitō person (地頭人) meant an influential local. Later, the term was sometimes used for persons who managed each local manor. Modern historians cannot clarify the character of the early jitō appointed by Minamoto no Yoritomo, as the conditions of these precursors are not well known.

Jitō were officially established when Minamoto no Yoritomo was appointed to the office of Head of jitō by the Imperial court with the right to their appointment. Yoritomo appointed many jitō nationwide, however mainly in the Kantō region. During the Kamakura period, the jitō were chosen amongst the gokenin (the shogun's vassals) who handled military affairs. Jitō handled the taxation and administration of the manor to which they were appointed, and directly administrated the lands and the farmers of the manor.

After the Jōkyū War in 1221, the shogunate appointed many jitō in Western Japan to the land that the people of the losing side and imperial court had possessed. At that time, many prominent gokenin, including the Mori clan and the Ōtomo clan, moved from the east to the west.

The jitō system was officially abolished in the late of 16th century by Toyotomi Hideyoshi.

References 

Government of feudal Japan
Medieval occupations